The flag of Tennessee displays an emblem on a field of red, with a strip of blue bordered by white on the fly. The emblem in the middle consists of three stars on a blue circle also with a white border. The central emblem portion of the flag has been adopted as the state's unofficial logo, and appears in the logos of some Tennessee-based companies and sports teams. Examples include the First Horizon Bank and the Tennessee Titans.

In 2001, the North American Vexillological Association surveyed its members on the designs of the 72 U.S. state, territorial, and Canadian provincial flags and ranked the Tennessee flag 14th.

History
As the American Civil War was approaching in 1861, a flag was initially proposed for the state.

In 1897, Tennessee adopted a red, white, and blue tricolor. The three bars were deliberately slanted in an effort to represent the geographically distinct regions of Tennessee. The flag included the number "16", Tennessee having been admitted as the 16th state of the Union, and the words "The Volunteer State", the state's official nickname.

The current flag was designed by Colonel Le Roy Reeves, a Johnson City attorney who was then serving in the Tennessee National Guard. The Tennessee General Assembly officially adopted the flag on April 17, 1905.

Description

Symbolism

The stars represent the three geographically and legally distinct Grand Divisions of Tennessee (i.e. East, Middle, and West Tennessee). The blue circle around the stars represents the unity of those grand divisions.  The blue bar at the edge of the flag was just a design consideration. When asked about the blue bar, Reeves stated "The final blue bar relieves the sameness of the crimson field and prevents the flag from showing too much crimson when hanging limp." In October 1917, National Geographic erroneously reported the stars represented the state as the third to enter the Union after the original thirteen.

Vexillologist Steven A. Knowlton believes that "the Tennessee flag has pragmatic unity with the Confederate flag: both share the element of white stars inside a fimbriated blue charge, and the element of that blue charge on a red field." He also notes the resemblance between the Tennessee State Flag and the third national flag of the confederacy. However, Knowlton also acknowledged that there is no direct evidence of the flag being designed to emulate the Confederate flag.

Star arrangement
State law dictates exactly how the central emblem is to be displayed on the flag.

In 1976, the U.S. Postal Service issued a sheet of 13 cent stamps illustrating U.S. state flags. Tennessee's was illustrated upside down.

Government flags

Alongside the state flag, there are other flags used by the government of Tennessee. The flag for the governor of Tennessee (shown at right) has been in use since 1939. It is a scarlet flag, with four stars, one in each corner, and the state military crest, a tree with three white stars, in the center. The Tennessee General Assembly has its own flag as well.

Gallery

See also

 List of Tennessee state symbols
 Seal of Tennessee

References

External links
 Tennessee Blue Book 2013-2014 
LeRoy Reeves in the collection of the Archives of Appalachia in Johnson City, Tennessee

Tennessee
Flags of Tennessee
Tennessee